The mission of The Cinderella Project is to support young women from across Louisiana with resources that may not exist for them otherwise.  The organization's goals are to provide educational outreach and community-based projects that are designed to build confidence and self-esteem and to instill the importance of community service and the value of giving back.  The Cinderella Project has chapters in Baton Rouge, Lafayette, Monroe, New Orleans, and Shreveport.

Founded in Baton Rouge in January 2008, The Cinderella Project is a 501(c)3 volunteer-led organization focused on two main programs: a Prom Dress Giveaway in the spring and a Leadership Academy in the fall.  Since its founding, the organization has collected approximately 15,000 donated prom dresses and distributed 4,300 dresses to students in 84 high schools in 18 parishes statewide.

The Cinderella Project of Baton Rouge hosts a Leadership Academy at Louisiana State University.  The Academy is an intensive college-prep workshop for underserved high school women. The Academy's objectives are to immerse young women in a college setting, expose them to educational opportunities available after high school and inspire them to pursue their future academic goals.  Each Leadership Academy graduate receives a stipend to take the ACT and a $500 college scholarship.

References

Organizations based in Baton Rouge, Louisiana